In the mathematical field of enumerative combinatorics, identities are sometimes established by arguments that rely on singling out one "distinguished element" of a set.

Definition

Let  be a family of subsets of the set  and let  be a distinguished element of set .

Thus the distinguished element allows for a decomposition according to a predicate that is a simple form of a divide and conquer algorithm. In combinatorics, this allows for the construction of recurrence relations. Examples are in the next section.

Examples
 The binomial coefficient  is the number of size-k subsets of a size-n set.  A basic identity—one of whose consequences is that the binomial coefficients are precisely the numbers appearing in Pascal's triangle—states that:

Proof: In a size-(n + 1) set, choose one distinguished element.  The set of all size-k subsets contains: (1) all size-k subsets that do contain the distinguished element, and (2) all size-k subsets that do not contain the distinguished element.  If a size-k subset of a size-(n + 1) set does contain the distinguished element, then its other k − 1 elements are chosen from among the other n elements of our size-(n + 1) set.  The number of ways to choose those is therefore .  If a size-k subset does not contain the distinguished element, then all of its k members are chosen from among the other n "non-distinguished" elements.  The number of ways to choose those is therefore .

The number of subsets of any size-n set is 2n.

Proof:  We use mathematical induction.  The basis for induction is the truth of this proposition in case n = 0.  The empty set has 0 members and 1 subset, and 20 = 1.  The induction hypothesis is the proposition in case n; we use it to prove case n + 1.  In a size-(n + 1) set, choose a distinguished element.  Each subset either contains the distinguished element or does not.  If a subset contains the distinguished element, then its remaining elements are chosen from among the other n elements.  By the induction hypothesis, the number of ways to do that is 2n.  If a subset does not contain the distinguished element, then it is a subset of the set of all non-distinguished elements.  By the induction hypothesis, the number of such subsets is 2n.  Finally, the whole list of subsets of our size-(n + 1) set contains 2n + 2n = 2n+1 elements.

 Let Bn be the nth Bell number, i.e., the number of partitions of a set of n members.  Let Cn be the total number of "parts" (or "blocks", as combinatorialists often call them) among all partitions of that set.  For example, the partitions of the size-3 set {a, b, c} may be written thus:

We see 5 partitions, containing 10 blocks, so B3 = 5 and C3 = 10.  An identity states:

Proof: In a size-(n + 1) set, choose a distinguished element.  In each partition of our size-(n + 1) set, either the distinguished element is a "singleton", i.e., the set containing only the distinguished element is one of the blocks, or the distinguished element belongs to a larger block.  If the distinguished element is a singleton, then deletion of the distinguished element leaves a partition of the set containing the n non-distinguished elements.  There are Bn ways to do that.  If the distinguished element belongs to a larger block, then its deletion leaves a block in a partition of the set containing the n non-distinguished elements.  There are Cn such blocks.

See also
 Combinatorial principles
 Combinatorial proof

References

Combinatorics
Mathematical principles